Smit Singh (born 18 January 1991) is a State Public Policy Advisor, Strategic Communications Expert, International Sportsperson and was Indian National Congress MLA candidate for Punjab Vidhan Sabha General Elections 2022. Singh studied at Somerville College, University of Oxford. Smit Singh has led multiple policy reforms implemented by the State Government of Punjab in 2021 along with developing a Public Policy Model for Governance of the State which was publicly accepted and announced to be implemented after constitution of his next Government by Chief Minister of Punjab (India) Charanjit Singh Channi.

International Sports Career 
Smit Singh is an International Skeet Shooter, representing India. Singh started his international sporting career by participation in the Asian Shooting Championships, held in Kuwait in December 2007. He won his first international medal at Asian Clay Shooting Championships, February 2008. Later in the year, he won silver and bronze medal at the South Asian Shooting Championships, November 2008. He won India its first world-level medal in skeet shooting with a bronze trophy at International Junior Cup, Orimattila, Finland, July 2011. 

At the ISSF World Cup, Al Ain, United Arab Emirates in April 2013, Smit Singh scored 123 out of 125 in qualifications, equalling the then World and Olympic Record, along with creating a new National Record of India. He is also the present National Games champion, having won two gold medals at the 35th National Games, Kerala, in February 2015. 

After taking a year long break to study at the University of Oxford, in 2018 Smit returned to better his qualification score to 124 out of 125, becoming India Rank 1 again. He subsequently represented India at the Commonwealth Games 2018 held in Gold Coast, Australia and was the only Indian who qualified for the finals in Skeet Men’s Event.
Apart from Asian Games, Commonwealth Games and World Championships in over a decade long career in international sports, Singh participated in numerous other international championships for the Indian National Team.

On 9 July 2019, Smit Singh was awarded the Maharaja Ranjit Singh Award for his contribution in the field of sports (the Government of Punjab‘s highest civilian honour).

Public Service 
Smit Singh started working with Civil Society in his high school years, volunteering with Education and Environment focused Non-Government Organisation, an Indian Express report states that Singh while representing India in sports, used to regularly intern with social movements during his time off from international sports, working with NGOs such as Aman Biradari, environmental awareness campaigns such as Swechha Delhi and working for justice through People’s Movements such as Narmada Bachao Andolan for rehabilitation of people, negatively affected by the large scale dams built in the Narmada Valley.

Before working with the Government of Punjab, India and Indian National Congress Party Singh was a career Civil Servant with the  Oil & Natural Gas Corporation a Government of India owned Public Sector Undertaking. 

In 2018, Smit advised the Government of Punjab on Municipal Solid Waste and Water Management. In 2020, Smit Singh led a Public Policy Think Tank as Chief Administrator of former Cabinet Minister Navjot Singh Sidhu’s Jittega Punjab initiative to research and effectively communicate diverse range of policy solutions to problems faced by the people of Punjab. Singh was the special invite-cum-advisor with Congress party high powered three member official delegation which met with 32 Indian Farmer Unions delegation, who were protesting against the three Indian Farm Laws of 2020 passed by BJP Government led by Prime Minister Modi to discuss the political solution for farmers demands on 10 September 2021, the controversial Farm Laws were later withdrawn by the Government of India due to ongoing protests by the Farmer Unions. 

On 26 January 2022, just three weeks before polling date of 2022 Punjab State General Elections, Smit Singh was announced as an Indian National Congress MLA candidate from Amargarh Assembly Constituency for Punjab Vidhan Sabha. All India Congress Committee Punjab In-charge Harish Chaudhary and Punjab Pradesh Congress Committee President Navjot Singh Sidhu announce Smit Singh as an Indian National Congress MLA candidate from Amargarh Assembly Constituency for Punjab Vidhan Sabha to further Singh’s Public Policy and social welfare agenda in solving Punjab’s financial crisis and writing the party’s state manifesto.  An election he lost to businessman and AAP’s candidate Jaswant Singh Gajjanmajra in a loop-sided election wherein the AAP stormed to power with over 2/3rds majority in the State Legislative Assembly.

References

Skeet shooters
1991 births
Indian male sport shooters
Living people
Alumni of Somerville College, Oxford
Shooters at the 2010 Asian Games
Asian Games competitors for India